A Gamble for Love is a 1917 British silent sports film directed by Frank Wilson and starring Gerald Ames, James Lindsay and George Foley. It was based on the 1914 novel of the same title by Nat Gould, set in the horseracing world.

Cast
 Gerald Ames as Dennis Laurenny 
 James Lindsay as Lord Ingleby
 Arthur Walcott as Joe Rothey  
 Hubert Willis as Bryhynz 
 Violet Hopson as Fay de Launay 
 George Foley 
 John MacAndrews 
 J. Hastings Batson 
 Elijah Wheatley

References

Bibliography
 Low, Rachael. History of the British Film, 1914-1918. Routledge, 2005.

External links

1917 films
1910s sports drama films
British horse racing films
British silent feature films
British sports drama films
Films directed by Frank Wilson
Films set in England
Films based on British novels
British black-and-white films
1917 drama films
1910s English-language films
1910s British films
Silent sports drama films